You Got My Mind Messed Up is a 1967 album by James Carr.
Although Carr is not as well known as his contemporaries such as Otis Redding or Aretha Franklin, "You Got My Mind Messed Up" has been cited as one of the top soul music albums of all time. Allmusic gave it 5 stars from two different reviewers. On the 2002 re-release Mojo magazine stated "This is undoubtedly one of the greatest soul albums of all time." (10/02, p.118).

After Carr's death in 2001, Kent Records re-released the album with another dozen bonus tracks.

Track listing
 "Pouring Water on a Drowning Man" (Drew Baker, Dani McCormick) – 2:40
 "Love Attack" (Quinton Claunch) – 2:54
 "Coming Back to Me Baby" (George Jackson) – 1:59
 "I Don't Want to Be Hurt Anymore" (Dolly Greer) – 2:24
 "That's What I Want to Know" (James Carr, Roosevelt Jamison) – 1:56
 "These Ain't Raindrops" (Claunch) – 2:35
 "The Dark End of the Street" (Chips Moman, Dan Penn) – 2:34
 "I'm Going for Myself" (Ernest Johnson, Edgar Campbell) – 2:25
 "Lovable Girl" (O. B. McClinton) – 2:24
 "Forgetting You" (McClinton) – 2:54
 "She's Better Than You" (McClinton)– 2:22
 "You've Got My Mind Messed Up" (McClinton) – 2:25

2002 bonus tracks
 "These Arms of Mine" (Otis Redding) – 2:37
 "You Don't Want Me" (Roosevelt Jamison) – 2:11
 "There Goes My Used to Be" (Jamison) – 2:32
 "A Lucky Loser" (Homer Banks, Allen Jones) – 2:07
 "Dixie Belle" (Jerry Foster, Wilburn Rice) – 2:23
 "Search Your Heart" (Jackson, Raymond Moore) – 3:04
 "Sock It to Me,Baby!" (Lawrence Brown, Bob Crewe) – 2:14
 "My Adorable One" (Irral Ida Berger, Clara A. Thompson) – 3:29
 "Love Is a Beautiful Thing" (Edward Brigati, Felix Cavaliere) – 2:46
 "Life Turned Her That Way" (Harlan Howard) – 2:58
 "A Losing Game" (James Carr, Denny Weaver) – 2:02
 "What Can I Call My Own" (Larry Rogers) – 2:47

Charts
United States

References

1967 debut albums
James Carr (musician) albums
Kent Records albums